Yab Moung Records (YMR) was established in 2012 and was Cambodia's first alternative music label. Yab Moung was founded by Myles Hallin (Myley Rattle) and Tom Reichelt in collaboration with several Khmer punk and metal bands, namely: Sliten6ix; The ANTIfate and No Forever. Tom Reichelt left in 2014, after that Timon Siebel & Samphors Un, two long time supporters, became major shareholders with Myley Rattle and began to run the label on the ground as a collective with various Khmer artists. The label has been partially rebranded since 2015 and is currently run and owned collectively by a group of dedicated Khmer alternative musicians with various roles within the organisation. Yab Moung Records has a studio which is located in the Kandal Province, just outside of Phnom Penh, which is also run by a collective of, predominantly Khmer, musicians and artists.

About
Yab Moung Records is Cambodia's first and only alternative music label focusing largely on punk, metal, hardcore and rock music. It was the first organisation to promote Khmer metal, punk and alternative music within Cambodia. YMR is also responsible for the recording and production of the first metal and hard-core tracks ever released in Cambodia and recently has released a music video for the first Death Metal song in Khmer ever released. Yab Moung Records, in partnership with the Phnom Penh's original punk venue Show Box, hosted its official launch concert which included a line up of the original bands that drove the alternative music scene in Cambodia, as well as the showing of Cambodias first all girl punk band, Count Us In,. Yab Moung Records has been pinnacle in hosting and encouraging Khmer contemporary creative expression and organising various alternative music performances throughout Cambodia. According to YMR's social media outlets the label aims to "encourage Khmer creative expression and alternative music" throughout a variety of forums, primarily using street level advertising, social media and free releases,. YMR is an independently run record label with a collective decision-making process. There is a unique alternative music scene existing within contemporary Khmer society, this is particularly apparent in Phnom Penh. The music coming from this movement is unique in South East Asia in terms of its style and drive, which is probably partly resulting from Cambodia's contemporary history, specifically the lack of direct influence within the alternative music and art scenes resulting from the Khmer Rouge Genocide. Despite an emergence of new artists, Khmer alternative music and art in remains relatively marginalised within Khmer society.

Yab Moung Records had a hard time finding its place. For years it struggled with survival, with the second generation of bands Doch Chkae and Vartey Ganiva on the label finding it hard to place in Cambodian contemporary society. They constantly faced problems with money. Money for production, money for recordings, money to “buy” the time to practice, money for equipment, promotion, events etc. On top of being based in an environment where people are not used to paying money for original content or shows. The common struggles of an artist, with a label in the back, which was managed by people for the passion and for the vision to support diversity within the Cambodian music market.

In 2019, with the breakthrough of Doch Chkae playing Wacken Open Air Festival in Germany, things began to change. The NGO, Moms Against Poverty (MAP) and its Phnom Penh based NGO, MAP Cambodia (MAPC) where Doch Chkae was not only founded and formed into a band but also literarily and creatively nurtured over the years, showed interest to invest. MAP, sharing an understanding of the value of the therapeutic aspect of the arts and how important it is to build a foundation, a stable and secure surrounding for artists, especially in a developing country such as Cambodia.

Yab Moung is collectively run, and was initially tied in closely with community-run music and art workshops called the CAM Projects, originally started and funded by Show Box and Timon Siebel, now funded by MAP and other community organisations and relies on the work of shareholders, collaborations with musicians and artists and volunteers. Major contributors towards the development of the label pre-2015 have included: Conrad Keely, Ned Kelly, Myley Rattle and Vanntin Hoeurn.

Bands/Artists representing Yab Moung Records include or have included: Sliten6ix, ANTI-fate, No Forever, Nightmare AD, Doch Ckae, Count Us In, Pork Belly Tin and Phnom Skor and Vartey Ganiva.

Aims
Yab Moung's Mission Statement is to encourage the development alternative Khmer music, to create accessibility and provide a platform for Khmer alternative music, art and creative expression.

Name
'Yab Moung' roughly translated means 'pain in the ass' or 'annoying' in Khmer. The name was chosen collectively by Khmer alternative musicians and the labels founders

Origins
Khmer Music has a rich and unique history peaking in the 1960s before the Khmer Rouge Genocide. In the opening years of the 21st Century original alternative music began to emerge in Cambodia's capital of Phnom Penh. At this time Yab Moung was founded by Myles Hallin (aka Myley Rattle) and Tom Reichelt with the support and motivation of several Khmer alternative bands including Sliten6ix, The ANTIfate and No Forever. The catalyst behind the formation of Yab Moung Records was the lack of a Venue in Phnom Penh which was accessible to alternative Khmer artists and musicians and the disparity between the treatment of ex-pat and Khmer artists in terms of conditions and pay. The label aims to encourage the development of a Khmer contemporary music.  Yab Moung Records was started at the same time as the establishment of Phnom Penh's first cross-cultural, Khmer accessible, alternative venue, which was called “Show Box” 
It was the partial subject of an independent documentary series called 'Selapak' the first of four parts was released at the 2014 Cambodian Film Festival

Show Box
Show Box was conceived founded and developed by Myles Hallin aka Myley Rattle as a centre for creative expression and the alternate arts in Cambodia's capital Phnom Penh in 2012. According to Myley Rattle it aimed to provide a venue and platform for Khmer creative expression and alternative artists. Show Box as a medium of creative expression was able to help promote and develop alternative Khmer music, visual art, creative writing and spoken word poetry. Through Show Box Myles Hallin and Joshua Page were also able to develop and initiate various community projects which supported the Show Box ethos such as the CAM Projects, which are contemporary arts and music workshops for young Khmer, in cooperation with Cambodian-based artists.
Show Box was sold in early 2015 and the new owner topped supporting community development and creative expression workshops and also put an end to the long-running CAM Projects in Phnom Penh. Fortunately, the CAM Projects were moved out to Kandal Province, where they still continue to encourage orphans through creative expression critical thinking, music and art.

Current projects
Since 2019 Yab Moung has had increased access to funds as well as the expertise of MAP to transform Yab Moung Records into a sustainable label. Alongside the label, Yab Moung is developing a vocational training programme for media production and the build-up of a more youth-oriented record label for the younger generation to gain practical experience.
Yab Moung is currently working on several projects/releases with various Khmer alternative artists including Vanntin "Tin" Hoeurn, Vartey Ganiva, Phnom Skor and Doch Ckae,

References

Record labels